Matthew Simpson (born 10 August 1984) is a New Zealand former professional tennis player.

Simpson, a Saint Kentigern College product, is the son of tennis player Jeff Simpson. His uncle Russell Simpson also played on the international circuit. 

In 2007 he made his Davis Cup debut for a tie against the Philippines in Auckland, where he was beaten in a dead rubber reverse singles match by Patrick John Tierro.

ITF Futures finals

Doubles: 7 (1–6)

See also
List of New Zealand Davis Cup team representatives

References

External links
 
 
 

1984 births
Living people
New Zealand male tennis players